Angel's Last Mission: Love is a 2019 South Korean television series starring Shin Hye-sun, Kim Myung-soo, Lee Dong-gun, Kim Bo-mi, Do Ji-won, and Kim In-kwon. It aired on KBS2's Wednesdays and Thursdays at 22:00 (KST) from  May 22 to July 11, 2019.

Synopsis
Lee Yeon-seo (Shin Hye-sun) is a supremely talented and successful ballerina who can say anything that she wants with her family's Fantasia Ballet Company but suffers a devastating accident during acting on stage that leaves her blind. She is bitter and abusive towards her staff, including her loyal secretary and butler, her sly family, and everyone else.  Dan (Kim Myung-soo) is an optimistic, carefree angel who is always getting into trouble. In order to return to heaven he is given the seemingly impossible mission of finding true love for Yeon-Seo, but ends up falling for her himself.

Cast

Main
 Shin Hye-sun as Lee Yeon-seo / Choi Seol-Hee / Giselle
A ballerina who has never believed in love. She is abusive to her staff until Dan sent them off even though she ordered them not to leave.
 Kim Myung-soo as Dan / Kim Dan / Yoo Seong-woo 
An angel who can return to Heaven only if his mission is a success.
 Lee Dong-gun as Ji Kang-woo
Yeon-seo's mentor as well as her ballet instructor. He is a fallen angel who is initially obsessed with her as she is his dead lover's doppelganger but eventually falls in love with her. 
 Kim Bo-mi as Geum Ni-na
Yeon-seo's cousin, who is also a ballerina, she has a crush on Kang-woo.
 Do Ji-won as Choi Yeong-ja
Ni-na's mother, director of the Fantasia Ballet. A greedy woman who will stop at nothing to get what she wants.
 Kim In-kwon as Hu
An archangel that gives missions to Dan.

Supporting
 Lee Ye-na as Hwang Jeong-eun
 Woo Hee-jin as Chung Yu-mi
 Lee Hwa-ryong as Park Gyeong-il
 Gil Eun-hye as Geum Ru-na
Yeon-Seo's cousin who will do anything to get her sister what she wants. She is even more devious in her machinations than her mother. 
 Kim Seung-wook as Geum Ki-chun
 Lee Je-yun as Ki Joon-soo
 Kim Yi-kyung as Gi Bo-ra
 Jo Sung-hyun as Ko Sung-min
 Park Won-sang as ballet company director

Special appearances
 Jang Hyun-sung as Cho Seung-wan (Ep. 1–2)
 Kim Ki-moo as dog stealer (Ep. 1)
 Lee Se-na as Yeon-seo's mother (Ep. 2)
 Lee Seok-jun as Yeon-seo's father (Ep. 2)
 Park Sang-myun (Ep. 2, 7, 9, 11–12)

Production
The first script reading took place on January 18, 2019 at KBS Annex Broadcasting Station in Yeouido, South Korea.

Original soundtrack

Part 1

Part 2

Part 3

Part 4

Part 5

Part 6

Part 7

Classic OST

Viewership

Awards and nominations

Notes

References

External links
  
 Angel's Last Mission: Love at Monster Union 
 Angel's Last Mission: Love at Victory Contents 
 
 
 

Korean Broadcasting System television dramas
Korean-language television shows
2019 South Korean television series debuts
2019 South Korean television series endings
South Korean romance television series
South Korean fantasy television series
Television series by Victory Contents
Television series by Monster Union